Voshchikha is a rural locality (a village) in Chertkovskoye Rural Settlement, Selivanovsky District, Vladimir Oblast, Russia. The population was 33 as of 2010.

Geography 
Voshchikha is located on the Tetrukh River, 9 km northeast of Krasnaya Gorbatka (the district's administrative centre) by road. Yesipovo is the nearest rural locality.

References 

Rural localities in Selivanovsky District